"I Believe in Father Christmas" is a song by English musician Greg Lake with lyrics by Peter Sinfield. Although it is often categorised as a Christmas song, this was not Lake's intention. He said that he wrote the song in protest at the commercialisation of Christmas.
Sinfield, however, said that the words are about a loss of innocence and childhood belief. Released in 1975, the song reached number two on the UK Singles Chart, number 17 on the Irish Singles Chart and number 98 in Australia.

Background

Lake wrote the song at his west London home, after tuning the bottom string of his guitar from E down to D. While the song is against the commercialisation of Christmas, it has often been misinterpreted as an anti-religious song and, because of this, Lake was surprised at its success. He explained in a Mojo magazine interview:"I find it appalling when people say it's politically incorrect to talk about Christmas, you've got to talk about 'The Holiday Season'. Christmas was a time of family warmth and love. There was a feeling of forgiveness, acceptance. And I do believe in Father Christmas."

The instrumental riff between verses comes from the "Troika" portion of Sergei Prokofiev's Lieutenant Kijé Suite, written for the 1934 Soviet film Lieutenant Kijé; this was added at the suggestion of Keith Emerson (an adaptation of the same song was used on Emerson's later Christmas album). Peter Sinfield described the song as "a picture-postcard Christmas, with morbid edges."

Release

The song was recorded by Lake in 1974 and released separately from ELP in 1975, reaching number two in the UK Singles Chart. It was kept from number one by Queen's "Bohemian Rhapsody". Lake commented: "I got beaten by one of the greatest records ever made. I would've been pissed off if I'd been beaten by Cliff (Richard)." However, orchestrator Godfrey Salmon said: "I was surprised the single wasn't more successful. I thought 'Bohemian Rhapsody' was rubbish, and still do. When it got to No 1 before we'd even brought ours out, I thought it would be long gone by Christmas. How wrong can you get?" The record continued to sell and in 1984 and 1986 reached 84 and 98, respectively, on the UK Singles Chart. The song also reached #98 in Australia in late 1975.

Video
The video for the record was shot on the Sinai Peninsula of Egypt, and in the Dead Sea Scrolls caves in the West Bank, and includes footage from the Vietnam War and Six-Day War.

Legacy

A second recording by the full ELP trio, but with a sparser arrangement, was included on the 1977 album Works Volume 2. It was recorded a third time in 1993, for the ELP box set The Return of the Manticore, and Lake revisited it yet again for the 2002 Sanctuary Records compilation A Classic Rock Christmas. The song has also appeared on several other ELP and Christmas compilation albums including a 1995 EP titled I Believe in Father Christmas, which includes Lake's original single as well as the Works Volume II version.

The song has been covered by other artists, including Robbie Williams on "The Christmas Present" in 2019, Toyah Willcox on "Pop Goes Christmas" in 1982, Elaine Paige (on her 1986 album Christmas), Canadian band Honeymoon Suite (on the 1989  WEA compilation album Revellion), Vertical Horizon (on the 2002 compilation Holiday: Sounds of the Season 2002), Sarah Brightman (on her 2008 album A Winter Symphony), U2 (on the 2009 Starbucks charity compilation All You Need Is Love), Joe McElderry on his 2011 album Classic Christmas, Susan Boyle (on her 2013 album Home for Christmas), Hannah Peel as the B-side of her 2014 single Find Peace and In Isolation as a single in 2022.

In 2005 Lake wrote a letter to The Guardian about the song, in answer to a reader question regarding whether it was possible to survive on Christmas royalties alone:
In 1975, I wrote and recorded a song called "I Believe in Father Christmas", which some Guardian readers may remember and may even own. It was a big hit and it still gets played on the radio every year around December, and it appears on more or less every Christmas compilation going. So I can tell you from experience that it's lovely to get the old royalty cheque around September every year, but on its own, the Christmas song money isn’t quite enough to buy my own island in the Caribbean. I'm on tour at the moment and the Christmas song is as well received now as it was 30 years ago – maybe even more so. If Guardian readers could all please request it be played by their local radio stations, maybe that Caribbean island wouldn’t be so far away – and if I get there, you’re all invited.

Charts

Certifications

References

Songs about Santa Claus
1975 singles
Emerson, Lake & Palmer songs
Songs with lyrics by Peter Sinfield
Songs written by Greg Lake
Song recordings produced by Greg Lake
1975 songs
1984 singles
1986 singles
Susan Boyle songs
U2 songs
Joe McElderry songs
Toyah Willcox songs